Top Hooker is an American reality fishing competition television series that premiered June 2, 2013 on Animal Planet. As of June 2013, casting for a second season is taking place.

Cast

Season 1

Larysa Switlyk
Dzifa Glymin
Greg Mcnamara
Kevin Vendituoli
Patrick Crawford – Winner
Danny De Vries
Chris Wright
Ian Esterhuizen
Melanie Housh
Attila Agh

Episodes

Season 1 (2013)

Reception
Andy Dehnart from Reality Blurred said a comment at the beginning of premiere episode almost lost him. Melissa Camacho of Common Sense Media gave the show a 3 out of 5 stars.

References

External links
 Official Page
 Top Hooker

2013 American television series debuts
2013 American television series endings
Animal Planet original programming
Fishing television series